Elena Naumoska (born 6 April 1994) is a Macedonian footballer who plays as a midfielder for the North Macedonia national team.

International career
Naumoska made her debut for the North Macedonia national team on 22 April 2020, against the Netherlands.

References

1994 births
Living people
Women's association football midfielders
Macedonian women's footballers
North Macedonia women's international footballers